Belorechensky (masculine), Belorechenskaya (feminine), or Belorechenskoye (neuter) may refer to:
Belorechensky District, a district of Krasnodar Krai, Russia
Belorechenskoye Urban Settlement, several municipal urban settlements in Russia
Belorechensky, Russia (Belorechenskaya, Belorechenskoye), several inhabited localities in Russia
Bilorichenskyi (Belorechensky), an urban-type settlement in Luhansk Oblast, Ukraine
Belorechenskaya railway station, a railway station on the North Caucasus Railway, Russia
Belorechenskaya Hydroelectric Station, a power station in Russia
Bilorichenska coal mine (Belorechenskaya coal mine), a coal mine in Ukraine